The 1932 Úrvalsdeild was contested by 5 teams, and KR won the championship.

League standings

Results

References

Úrvalsdeild karla (football) seasons
Iceland
Iceland
Urvalsdeild